Hypomartyria is a genus of small primitive metallic moths in the family Micropterigidae.

Species
Hypomartyria micropteroides Kristensen & Nielsen, 1982 

Micropterigidae
Moth genera
Taxa named by Ebbe Nielsen